David M. Carroll (born 5 January 1942) is an American naturalist, author and illustrator.

He has investigated for the endangered species programs of New Hampshire, Vermont, Maine, the Environmental Protection Agency, and the National Park Service.  He lives in Warner, New Hampshire.

Awards
 2009 National Book Award Finalist, Nonfiction 
 2006 MacArthur Fellows Program
 2001 John Burroughs Medal for distinguished nature writing
 Environmental Merit Award from the EPA 
 Tudor Richards Award, from NH Audubon Society

Works
 The Year of the Turtle: A Natural History, DIANE Publishing Company, 1999, 
 Trout reflections: a natural history of the trout and its world, St. Martin's Press, 1993, 
 Swampwalker's Journal: A Wetlands Year, Houghton Mifflin Harcourt, 2001, 
 Self-Portrait with Turtles: A Memoir, Houghton Mifflin Harcourt, 2005, 
 Following the Water: A Hydromancer's Notebook, Houghton Mifflin Harcourt, 2009,

References

External links
"Naturalist David Carroll Wins MacArthur Grant", NHPR, Lisa Peakes, September 19, 2006.
 (talk at Tufts University)

1942 births
American male writers
MacArthur Fellows
Living people
People from Warner, New Hampshire
Writers from New Hampshire